Alexander John Sturgis (born 6 November 1963) is a British art historian and museum curator. He is the current Director of the Ashmolean Museum in Oxford. He was Director of the Holburne Museum in Bath from 2005 to September 2014.

Early life
Sturgis was born on 6 November 1963 in London, England. He was educated at Marlborough College, a private school in Marlborough, Wiltshire. He studied history at University College, University of Oxford from 1982 to 1985. He graduated Bachelor of Arts (BA), which was later promoted to Master of Arts (MA). He then undertook post-graduate study in art history at the Courtauld Institute of Art in London. He completed his Doctor of Philosophy (PhD) in 1990.

Career
Sturgis worked at the National Gallery, an art museum in London, from 1991 to 2005. Beginning his career in the education department, he later served as exhibitions and programmes curator for six years, from 1999 to 2005. In 2005, he was appointed Director of the Holburne Museum in Bath. During his time at Holburne, he oversaw a renovation of the museum that included a £13 million extension.

He moved to the City of Oxford for the beginning of the 2014/15 academic year to take up the appointment of Director of the University of Oxford's Ashmolean Museum on 1 October 2014. He is also a Supernumerary Fellow of Worcester College, Oxford.

His publications include Rebels and Martyrs: The Image of the Artist in the Nineteenth Century (2006) and Presence: Sculpture and the Portrait (2012).

Personal life
In his spare time, Sturgis is a magician under the name The Great Xa and once appeared on 1990s British TV programme The Word appearing to swallow sharp razor blades.

Selected works

References

Living people
1963 births
Place of birth missing (living people)
People educated at Marlborough College
Alumni of University College, Oxford
Alumni of the Courtauld Institute of Art
British art historians
British magicians
British art curators
English curators
Fellows of Worcester College, Oxford
People associated with the Ashmolean Museum
Directors of museums in the United Kingdom